Rymosia is a genus of flies belonging to the family Mycetophilidae.

The species of this genus are found in Europe, Russia, Japan and America.

Species:
 Palaeoepicypta longicalcar (Meunier, 1904) 
 Rhymosia foersteri (Theobald, 1937)

References

Mycetophilidae